 

Dean Martin Hits Again is a 1965 studio album by Dean Martin, produced by Jimmy Bowen and arranged by Ernie Freeman. The album was a Top 20 hit, and Martin's fourth gold album.

This was Martin's first album to be produced by Bowen and arranged by Freeman. The previous year they had arranged and produced Martin's biggest hit, "Everybody Loves Somebody". "You're Nobody 'Til Somebody Loves You" had appeared on the 1964 album The Door Is Still Open to My Heart.

Dean Martin Hits Again peaked at 13 on the Billboard 200. "Send Me the Pillow You Dream On," went into the Top 20 of the pop charts and the Top 5 of the easy listening chart.

Reception

The initial Billboard magazine review from February 13, 1965 commented that "Rack up another winner for Dino...well chosen material, well performed and strong support from Ernie Freeman's arrangements".

William Ruhlmann on Allmusic.com gave the album three stars out of five and commented that the production formula of Bowen and Freeman was "already sounding very repetitious".

Track listing

Personnel 
 Dean Martin – vocals
 Ernie Freeman - arranger
 Jimmy Bowen - producer

References 

1965 albums
Dean Martin albums
Albums arranged by Ernie Freeman
Albums produced by Jimmy Bowen
Reprise Records albums